Government E. N. T. Hospital is one of the oldest specialty hospitals in Hyderabad, India. It is located in Koti and run by the Government of Telangana. It exclusively serves the patients with ear, nose or throat diseases across the state of Telangana.

The building now housing the ENT Hospital earlier was the residence of Parsi businessmen brothers Pestonji Meherji and Viccaji Meherji

Departments
 Audiology : The audiology wing daily receives about 200 patients. It deals with newborn screening, hearing assessment, hearing loss, rehabilitation and verifying hearing-impaired cases. and it has Special Education School to the Physically challenged (hearing and speech) pupils with specially trained teachers.

And the building architecture is very nice with mixture of Ghothic and indo style. It is the right place for the archaeology students to study mansion work, glass work and marble sculptures of the old ages.

References

Hospitals in Hyderabad, India
Heritage structures in Hyderabad, India